"Last Chance to Dance" is a compilation album released in 1982 by New Zealand band, Hello Sailor. It reached number 11 on the New Zealand music charts. It was repackaged with a greatest hits album by fellow New Zealand band Th' Dudes and re-released on CD in 1991, where it reached number 35 on the New Zealand music charts.

Track listing

Credits
 Artwork – Peter Urlich
 Bass – Lisle Kinney
 Drums – Ricky Ball
 Engineer – Ian Morris
 Guitar, Vocals – Dave McArtney, Harry Lyon
 Producer – Rob Aicken
 Vocals, Saxophone, Harmonica – Graham Brazier

References

Hello Sailor (band) albums
1982 albums